Hogback Bridge was an historic Pennsylvania (Petit) truss bridge located in Curwensville, Clearfield County, Pennsylvania, United States.  It was built in 1893 by the King Bridge Company.

It was listed on the National Register of Historic Places in 1988. It is now torn down.

References

See also 
 National Register of Historic Places listings in Clearfield County, Pennsylvania

Road bridges on the National Register of Historic Places in Pennsylvania
Bridges completed in 1893
Transportation buildings and structures in Clearfield County, Pennsylvania
King Bridge Company
National Register of Historic Places in Clearfield County, Pennsylvania
Pratt truss bridges in the United States